Albert Barty Miller was born December 12, 1957, in Kasavu, Cakaudrove, Fiji. Miller is a former decathlete and Olympian from Fiji. His personal best 7397 points, also the current national record of Fiji.

See also
 Fiji at the 1984 Summer Olympics
 Fiji at the 1988 Summer Olympics
 Fiji at the 1992 Summer Olympics

References

External links

Living people
1957 births
Fijian decathletes
Commonwealth Games competitors for Fiji
Athletes (track and field) at the 1986 Commonwealth Games
Olympic athletes of Fiji
Athletes (track and field) at the 1984 Summer Olympics
Athletes (track and field) at the 1988 Summer Olympics
Athletes (track and field) at the 1992 Summer Olympics
Fijian male hurdlers
People from Cakaudrove Province
Fijian people of British descent